Bela formica is a species of sea snail, a marine gastropod mollusk in the family Mangeliidae.

This species is considered by many authors as a synonym of Bela nebula, but tentatively regarded as valid by Della Bella et al. (2015). it is therefore considered a taxon inquirendum

Description

Distribution
Fossil specimens were found in Pleistocene strata in Italy. Recent specimens were found in the Adriatic Sea and in the Aegean Sea.

References

  Della Bella G., Naldi F. & Scarponi D. (2015). Molluschi marini del Plio-Pleistocene dell'Emilia-Romagna e della Toscana - Superfamiglia Conoidea, vol. 4, Mangeliidae II. Lavori della Società Italiana di Malacologia. 26: 1-80

External links
  Tucker, J.K. 2004 Catalog of recent and fossil turrids (Mollusca: Gastropoda). Zootaxa 682:1-1295.

formica